Greg Hirte is a professional violinist, actor, and composer based out of Chicago, Illinois.

He performs with a handful of bands, including Mucca Pazza, The Flashbulb, Golden Horse Ranch Band, Gin Palace Jesters, Can Ky Ree, Mojo & The Bayou Gypsies and formerly with Soundframe. His violin performances have also appeared on many albums, most notably The Flashbulb's "Kirlian Selections", "Réunion" and "Soundtrack To A Vacant Life".

Hirte  is an actor, musician, and composer in LA and Chicago. Circa 2020 Hirte was most recently seen at Lookingglass in last season’s The Steadfast Tin Soldier.  The Steafast Tin Soldier production has been called a "a triumph in creativity and imagination". Before that, Treasure Island. Other recent theatre credits include: his 19th season with Goodman Theatre’s A Christmas Carol, Leon in Hank Williams: Lost Highway (American Blues Theater) and Luther in Ring of Fire: Music of Johnny Cash. Other Chicago credits include: performance and musical compositions for Goodman Theatre, Chicago Shakespeare Theater, Court Theatre, Drury Lane Theatre, Victory Gardens Theater, and Piven Theatre Workshop (Jeff Award Nomination for Best Original Score, Sarah Ruhl’s Melancholy Play), as well as several international theater and music festivals. Hirte is a member of several bands both local and national."

References

Living people
American male violinists
21st-century American violinists
21st-century American male musicians
Year of birth missing (living people)